

First issues
The first stamps specifically for the Falkland Islands Dependencies were issued in 1944 and consisted of overprints on stamps of the Falkland Islands for Graham Land, South Georgia, the South Orkneys and the South Shetlands.

Later issues
General issues inscribed "Falkland Islands Dependencies" were issued from 1946. In 1963, British Antarctic Territory was formed, leaving in the Dependencies only the island groups of South Georgia and the South Sandwich Islands which had stamps issued as "South Georgia". 
 
Stamps of the Falkland Islands Dependencies were again issued in 1980, before being replaced by those of the newly formed territory of South Georgia and the South Sandwich Islands in 1985.

See also
Postage stamps and postal history of the Falkland Islands
Postage stamps and postal history of South Georgia and the South Sandwich Islands
Postage stamps and postal history of the British Antarctic Territory

References

Further reading
Grant, B.S.H. (1952) The Postage Stamps of the Falkland Islands and Dependencies. London: Stanley Gibbons.

External links
The Falkland Islands Philatelic Study Group.

Philately of the Falkland Islands